The Loktantrik Janata Dal (LJD) was an unrecognized registered political party in India. It was nationally launched by Sharad Yadav and Ali Anwar in May 2018. The party was formed after Yadav parted ways from Janata Dal (United), due to its alliance with Bharatiya Janata Party in Bihar. It merged with Rashtriya Janata Dal (RJD) on 20 March 2022.

Bahujan Mukti Party a political wing of BAMCEF was merged with Loktantrik Janata Dal. Pravendra Pratap Singh is the current President of the Bahujan Mukti party.
The Veerendra Kumar fraction of the Janata Dal (United) unit of Kerala under the leadership of M. P. Veerendra Kumar merged with the party. Currently the party has 1 representative in the  Kerala Legislative Assembly

LJD merged with Rashtriya Janata Dal (RJD) on 20 March 2022, Sharad Yadav has taken up the task of re-uniting all the former Janata Dal factions and other parties with similar ideologies to put forward a united opposition for 2024 Lok Sabha elections.
Although Kerala unit of the party did not join RJD. The Kerala faction has planned to merge with Janata Dal (Secular).

References

External links
Official website

2018 establishments in India
Dalit politics
Political parties established in 2018
Janata Dal
Janata Dal (United)
Registered unrecognised political parties in India
Socialist parties in India